Rhizotrogus is a genus of scarab beetles (and June beetles) in the subfamily Melolonthinae.

List of species
 Rhizotrogus aestivus (Olivier, 1789)
 Rhizotrogus almeriensis Baraud, 1970
 Rhizotrogus angelesae Galante, 1981
 Rhizotrogus camerosensis Baguena-Corella, 1955
 Rhizotrogus chevrolati Graells, 1858
 Rhizotrogus coiffaiti Baraud, 1979
 Rhizotrogus creticus Brenske, 1891
 Rhizotrogus flavicans Blanchard, 1850
 Rhizotrogus granatensis Baguena-Corella, 1955
 Rhizotrogus iglesiasi (Baguena-Corella, 1955)
 Rhizotrogus marginipes Mulsant, 1842
 Rhizotrogus mascarauxi Desbrochers, 1895
 Rhizotrogus monticola Blanchard, 1850
 Rhizotrogus nevadensis Reitter, 1902
 Rhizotrogus pallidipennis Blanchard, 1850
 Rhizotrogus parvulus Rosenhauer, 1858
 Rhizotrogus ribbei Reitter, 1908
 Rhizotrogus romanoi Sabatinelli, 1975
 Rhizotrogus rosalesi Fairmaire, 1862
 Rhizotrogus sassariensis Perris, 1870
 Rhizotrogus siculus Baraud, 1970
 Rhizotrogus villiersi Baraud, 1970

References 

 

 
Scarabaeidae genera